is a Japanese manga series by Takara Akegami. Coffee & Vanilla is serialized in the monthly  manga magazine Cheese! since June 2015. A live-action television drama adaptation ran from July 5, 2019 to September 6, 2019.

Plot
Risa Shiragi is a popular student at her university known for her beauty, but she has a timid personality, which prevents her from entering relationships with others. One day, after Hiroto Fukami rescues her from a stalker, she becomes attracted to his mature personality and they begin dating. Throughout their relationship, Risa tries to match Fukami's maturity and hopes one day to become a suitable partner for him.

Characters

Portrayed by Haruka Fukuhara (TV drama)
Risa is a 20-year-old college student who is popular among other students for her beauty, but is very shy in reality.

Portrayed by Dori Sakurada (TV drama)
Fukami is the 32-year-old CEO of Fukami Holdings.

Portrayed by Mario Kuroba (TV drama)
Akutsu is Fukami's rival and the CEO of Akutsu Corporation. He is popular with women.

Portrayed by Yuki Ogoe (TV drama)
Yoshiki is Risa's classmate. He is friendly and falls in love with Risa.

Portrayed by Noa Kita (TV drama)
Natsuki is Risa's childhood friend who later enters a friends-with-benefits relationship with Akutsu.

Portrayed by Shogo Hama (TV drama)
Yuki is Fukami's secretary. He was Fukami's classmate when they were in high school and has been in love with him since.

Media

Manga

Coffee & Vanilla is written and illustrated by Takara Akegami. It is serialized in the monthly  manga magazine Cheese! since the June 2015 issue. The chapters were later released in bound volumes by Shogakukan under the Flower Comics imprint. A spin-off series titled Coffee & Vanilla: Black, focusing on side characters Natsuki and Akutsu, began running concurrently in 2018 in the magazine Premier Cheese!

Coffee & Vanilla

Coffee & Vanilla: Black

Television drama

A live-action television series adaptation was announced in June 2019 and slated for release on July 4, 2019. The series stars Haruka Fukuhara as Risa, Dori Sakurada as Fukami, Mario Kuroba as Akutsu, Yuki Ogoe as Tsubasa, Noa Kita as Natsuki, and Shogo Hama as Yuki. The television series aired weekly on MBS TV at 1 AM as part of their  programming block, with other broadcasts on TV Kanagawa and Television Saitama. The opening theme song is "You & I" by Good on the Reel and the ending theme is "Melancholic" by Airi Miyakawa.

Episodes

Reception

The series ranked #6 in the shojo and josei category on the digital book service BookLive! in the first half of 2019.

Volume 10 debuted at #12 on Oricon and sold 45,368 copies. Volume 11 debuted at #6 on Oricon and sold 70,155 copies.

References

External links
 
 Official television series website

Japanese romance television series
Japanese television dramas based on manga
Josei manga
Romance anime and manga
Shogakukan manga